Super Monkey Ball Jr. is a platform game, part of the Super Monkey Ball series, developed by Realism for the Game Boy Advance. It is one of the few games on the system to make use of its 3D graphics capabilities. It is generally seen as a port of the first game in the Super Monkey Ball series, as it reuses many levels from it, but has a few differences.

Gameplay

Main game 
As with previous entries, the objective of Super Monkey Ball Jr. is to control a monkey to reach the goal before time is over. New to this game, the player has the option to speed up or slow down the tilt by pressing the A or B Buttons respectively.

Party games 
Monkey Duel: Playable with only two players, both players race to the finish as fast as they can while picking up any nearby bananas. The winning player gets 5 bananas added to their overall total. The mode can be played up to five rounds and the player who has the most bananas at the end of the specified number of rounds wins. There is also an option to give one player or the other a head start, up to 5 seconds.

Monkey Bowling, Monkey Fight, and Monkey Golf, all three minigames that were present in Super Monkey Ball, return in this game and function exactly like their original appearances. With the exception of Monkey Fight, players can play Monkey Bowling and Monkey Golf on one Game Boy Advance system by alternating turns.

Characters
Like many other games of Super Monkey Ball series, the player has the option to choose AiAi, MeeMee, Baby or GonGon. In multiplayer, two to four people can pick the same character.

Reception
Reviews for Super Monkey Ball Jr. have been mostly positive, but the game was criticized for a lack of analog movement. IGN gave the game a 9/10, GameSpot gave the game an 8/10, and review aggregator Metacritic gave the game an 82/100, indicating "generally favorable reviews".

References

2002 video games
3D platform games
Game Boy Advance games
Game Boy Advance-only games
Jr
Sega video games
THQ games
Video games developed in the United Kingdom